Ecphyadophora is a genus of nematodes belonging to the family Tylenchidae.

The genus has almost cosmopolitan distribution.

Species:

Ecphyadophora basiri 
Ecphyadophora caelata 
Ecphyadophora elongata 
Ecphyadophora goodeyi 
Ecphyadophora quadralata 
Ecphyadophora tenuissima 
Ecphyadophora teres 
Ecphyadophora vallipuriensis

References

Nematodes